The Film-Makers' Cooperative a.k.a. legal name The New American Cinema Group, Inc. is an artist-run, non-profit organization incorporated in July 1961 in New York City by Jonas Mekas, Shirley Clarke, Stan Brakhage, Lionel Rogosin, Gregory Markopoulos, Lloyd Michael Williams and other filmmakers for the distribution, education and exhibition of avant-garde films and alternative media.

History
In the fall of 1960, Jonas Mekas and Lewis Allen organized several meetings with independent filmmakers in New York City that culminated on September 28, 1960 with them officially declaring themselves the New American Cinema Group. Two days later on Sept. 30, Mekas presented the first draft of a manifesto for the Group, which included a call to form a cooperative distribution center.

On January 7, 1961, at a contentious meeting of the Group, Amos Vogel attempted to stonewall the formation of the distribution center claiming that his own Cinema 16 organization should be the only distributor of experimental films. However, Vogel is shouted down after it was pointed out that Cinema 16 refused to distribute Stan Brakhage's Anticipation of the Night.

The Film-Makers' Cooperative would officially start distributing films in 1962.

Description
The Film-Makers' Cooperative holds a large collection of avantgarde and experimental films, with over 5,000 titles by more than 1,500 filmmakers and media artists.  The collection includes work authored on 35mm, 16mm, 8mm, video and DVD. The Cooperative rents out the films in its collection to cinématheques, film festivals, schools, universities, museums, and other art institutions in the United States and around the world.

Based upon a belief common to the founding members that the "official cinema is running out of breath" and has become "morally corrupt, aesthetically obsolete, thematically superficial, temperamentally boring" (as the original 1962 manifesto would have it), the Film-Makers' Cooperative was a key institution in the heyday of American experimental or "underground" film in the 1960s and 1970s, and has continued to operate on a non-exclusive basis to ensure the existence of an alternative, non-commercial film culture since then.

The Film-Makers' Cooperative is open to anyone who wishes to become a member.

The New York Film-Makers' Cooperative has inspired similar initiatives both within the United States (Canyon Cinema in San Francisco) and abroad (The London Film-Makers' Co-operative in England, and ABCinema in Denmark, and elsewhere).

Besides distributing its members' films, the Film-Makers' Cooperative is continuously involved in film preservation and DVD release projects, and in arranging screenings and events in and around New York City. In 2020, the Film-Maker's Cooperative expanded its distribution to online Video on Demand programs, including panels with the filmmakers such as Roberta Cantow.

Directors and Board Members
Founding Director: Jonas Mekas
Executive Director: M.M. Serra
Members of the Board: 
Katherine Bauer - co-President
Gregg Biermann - co-President
Richard Sylvarnes - Vice President
Joel Schlemowitz - Treasurer
Charles S. Cohen
Coleen Fitzgibbon
Melissa Friedling
Rachel Abernathy
Amanda Katz
Bradley Eros

Advisory Board:
Sebastian Mekas
Sara Driver
Jeffrey Deitch
Ken & Flo Jacobs
Bill Morrison
Rohesia Hamilton Metcalfe
Jim Hubbard
Jack Waters
Peter Cramer
Lynne Sachs
Peggy Ahwesh

References

External links
The New American Cinema Group / The Film-Makers’ Coop (official site) 

Experimental film festivals
Film organizations in the United States
Filmmaker cooperatives
Artist cooperatives in the United States
Jonas Mekas